The 2015 Torneo Internacional Challenger León was a professional tennis tournament played on hard courts. It was the thirteenth edition of the tournament which was part of the 2015 ATP Challenger Tour. It took place in León, Mexico between 6 April and 12 April 2015.

Singles main-draw entrants

Seeds

 1 Rankings are as of March 23, 2015.

Other entrants
The following players received wildcards into the singles main draw:
  Kevin Jack Carpenter
  Lucas Gómez
  Tigre Hank
  Alan Núñez Aguilera

The following players received entry from the qualifying draw:
  Nicolás Barrientos
  Kevin King
  Adam El Mihdawy
  Caio Zampieri

The following players received entry as a special exempt:
  Henrique Cunha

The following players received entry as an alternate:
  Giovanni Lapentti

Champions

Singles

  Austin Krajicek def.  Adrián Menéndez Maceiras, 6–7(3–7), 7–6(7–5), 6–4

Doubles

  Austin Krajicek /  Rajeev Ram def.  Guillermo Durán /  Horacio Zeballos, 6–2, 7–5

External links
Official Website

2015 ATP Challenger Tour
2015
2015 in Mexican tennis